is a Japanese singer and actress. She was part of a music trio in 1973, which included Momoe Yamaguchi and Masako Mori. Sakurada then became successful in a solo music career, with 18 top ten singles in the 1970s. Her acting career ran from 1973 to 1993. She received multiple awards for her acting roles, including the Hochi Film Award, Award of the Japanese Academy, Kinema Junpo Award, and Mainichi Film Concours.  Following her marriage, in a Blessing ceremony of the Unification Church in 1992, she retired from performing. In 2013, Junko Sakurada made a comeback.

Biography 
Sakurada was born in 1958. She is a singer and actress. In 1973, she was part of "a hit female trio", which also included musicians Momoe Yamaguchi and Masako Mori. The music trio became popular as part of the television program Producing the Stars (Star Tanjō!); they were known as "The Trio of Third-Year Junior High School Students" ("Hana no Chu 3 Trio"). According to Japan Pop!: Inside the World of Japanese Popular Culture, after this experience in a music group, she went off on her own to develop a solo music career, and became a megastar. Cruising the Anime City: An Otaku Guide to Neo Tokyo described Sakurada as a 1970s music idol, like Pink Lady and Linda Yamamoto.

Throughout the 1970s she released a string of hit singles; nine top 5 singles, and in total eighteen top 10 singles of which "Hajimete no Dekigoto" (First Affair) sold best, grossing over 527,000 copies according to Oricon and peaking at number one. After winning the 4th edition of the Star Tanjō! contest in 1972, with highest ever points and jury votes, she released her first single in February 1973 called "Tenshi Mo Yume Miru" (The Dreams of an Angel) which was written by Yu Aku, and sold over 120,000 copies while peaking at number 12. With the release of her third single, "Watashi No Aoi Tori" (My Bluebird), she won the prestigious Best Newcomer award the 15th edition of the Japan Record Award. In the winter of 1973 following 1974 the single "Hana Monogatari" (Flower Fairy Tales) was her first top ten hit single, which sold over 237,000 copies. She participated for the first time at the 25th edition of the Kōhaku Uta Gassen festival in 1974, with her hit single "Kiiroi Ribbon" (Yellow Ribbon). She would perform for a total of 9 times at the festival. In that same year she also performed in Finland.

Following the success of her single "Hajimete No Dekigoto", the song "Hitori Aruki" (Walking Alone) (which was the theme song for her first ever movie production "Spoon Ippai No Shiawase" (Spoonful of Happiness) was released in March 1975 and peaked at number 4, grossing over 350,000 copies. She was the best selling Japanese female musical artist of 1975, and 4th best selling of 1976. In the summer of 1975 the single "Juushichi No Natsu" (Seventeen Summers) was released, and became her second best selling single; grossing over 404,000 copies and peaking at number 2 on the Oricon charts. At the 17th edition of the Japan Record Awards "Juushichi No Natsu" won her the award for most popular artist voted by the public. In the fall of the same year she was awarded at the 6th edition of the Japan Music Awards for her single "Tenshi No Kuchibiru" (Lips of an Angel), which sold over 281,000 copies and peaked at number 4 on the charts.

After scoring a string of hits in 1976 and 1977 (most notably "Natsu Ni Giyojin" (Beware of the Summer) which sold 360,000 copies, "Ki Ga Tsuite Yo" (I Noticed) which sold 286,000 copies and "Kimagure Venus" (Whimsical Venus) which sold 210,000 copies) she was again awarded at the 20th edition of the Japan Record Awards for her single "Shiawase Shibai" (Pretending to be Happy) which sold over 366,000 copies and peaked at number 3 on the charts (penned by Miyuki Nakajima) with a gold medal. She would score her last top 10 hit single in the summer of 1978 with the disco inspired single "Lipstick", and would release her last single and album in 1983.

Several of her singles have also been featured on the Japanese music show "The Best Ten", which aired from 1978 up to 1989. These include "Shiawase Shibai" (peaking at no. 3), "Oi Kakete Yokohama" (peaking at no. 10), "Lipstick" (peaking at no. 8), "Hatachi Ni Nareba" (peaking at no. 11), "Fuyu Iro No Machi" (peaking at no. 20), and "Santa Monica No Kaze" (peaking at no. 17).

Sakurada's acting career began in 1973 and lasted through 1993, with roles in 13 films and many television dramas.  She received multiple awards for her acting roles, including the Hochi Film Award, Award of the Japanese Academy, Kinema Junpo Award, and Mainichi Film Concours.
 In 1991, her memoir, Gift God Gave Me, was published and the media reported that she had become a "movie heartthrob".

Sakurada is a member of the Unification Church founded by Sun Myung Moon in Seoul, South Korea in 1954. According to The Washington Times, which is owned by the Unification Church affiliated News World Communications, Sakurada joined the church in 1977.

In August 1992, Sakurada was married to a Japanese businessman who is also a Unification Church member and an official within the church in a Blessing ceremony of the Unification Church in Seoul, South Korea along with 10,000 other couples representing 131 nations. Sakurada said to journalists that she felt "very happy" to have married a husband selected for her by Moon.

According to The Australian, "Ms Sakurada disappeared from public life soon after the ceremony." One of Sakurada's last roles as a star was in the television piece Don't Call Me Auntie (Obasan Nante Yobanai de) on NHK. According to The Daily Yomiuri, "This was one of Junko Sakurada's last starring roles before she fell out of favor with the public. Since she took part in the Rev. Moon's Unification Church mass marriage in Seoul in August, it is said that her commercial contracts have evaporated." In 1999 a church spokesperson said: "Ms Sakurada is living happily with her husband and three children. She does not want to talk to the press."

In November 2006, she released a book titled Aisuru Junban.

In October 2013, Junko Sakurada re-appeared in the public eye after an absence of twenty years. She held a one-night only concert at the Hakuhinkan Theater in Tokyo, to commemorate her 40th year in showbusiness. She also released a best of album, Thanks 40, for the occasion.

In April 2017, Junko Sakurada performed as a guest at the Screen Music Feast held at the Hakuhinkan Theater in Tokyo. She performed songs from the musical Annie Get Your Gun, as well as her 1981 single Keshō. Tickets to the show sold out in a few minutes.

In February 2018, Junko Sakurada released a new album titled My Idology. In March of that same year, she promoted the album with a concert held at Hakuhinkan Theater in Tokyo.

Works

Music 
 Watashi No Aoi Tori (1973), winner of the newcomer's prize at the Japan Record Awards
 Hana Monogatari (1973), rose to the Oricon best ten
 Hajimete no Dekigoto (1975), reached Oricon No. 1
 Natsu Ni Goyōjin (1976), prizewinning performance
 Kimagure Venus (1977), nominated for a Japan Record Award
 Shiawase Shibai (1977), gold medal at Japan Record Awards
 Lipstick (1978)
 Santa Monica No Kaze (1979), won Producers' Association award at Japan Song Awards
 Keshō (1981)

Kōhaku Uta Gassen
  (1974)
  (1975)
  (1976)
  (1977)
  (1978)
  (1979)
  (1980)
 This is a "Boogie" (1981)
  (1982)

Charted singles

Studio albums

Live albums

Greatest hits releases

Film 
  (Shochiku, 1975)
  (Toho, 1975)
  (Shochiku, 1975)
  (Shochiku, 1976)
  (Toho, 1976)
  (Shochiku, 1977)
  (Toho, 1978)
  (Toho, 1979)
  (Toei, 1980)
  (Toei, 1987)
  (Toho, 1988)
  (Shochiku, 1989)
  (Toho, 1989)
  (Toei, 1990)
  (Toho, 1990)
  (Toho-Towa, 1991)
  (Kadokawa Pictures, 1993)

Television 
  (TV Asahi, 1973)
  (Nippon Television, 1974)
  (TBS, 1974)
  (Nippon Television, 1974–1975)
  (TBS, 1975)
  opening narrator (ABC (of Asahi) and Shochiku, 1978)
  (Nippon Television, 1978)
  (TBS, 1980)
  (TBS, 1981)
  (NHK, 1982)
  (TBS, 1982)
  (TBS and C.A.L, 1982)
  (TBS, 1983)
  (KTV, 1984)
 } (NTV, 1984)
  (TBS, 1985)
  (NHK, 1985)
  (NHK morning drama, 1985)
  (TBS Telepack, 1986)
  as Princess Mego, wife of Masamune (NHK Taiga drama, 1987)
  (CX, 1988)
  (NTV, 1989)
  (CX, 1990)
  (CX, 1991)
  – 8 hours 50 minutes (CX, 1991)
 （ANB, 1991）
  (CX, 1992)
  (four appearances)

Awards and nominations

See also 
 Blessing ceremony of the Unification Church
 Kayōkyoku

References

External links 
  (Victor Entertainment)
 

1958 births
Living people
Japanese actresses
Japanese women singers
Japanese idols
Japanese Unificationists
Unification Church and the arts
Singing talent show winners